Salebriaria is a genus of snout moths. It was described by Carl Heinrich in 1956.

Species
Salebriaria ademptandella (Dyar, 1908)
Salebriaria annulosella (Ragonot, 1887)
Salebriaria bella Neunzig, 1988
Salebriaria borealis Neunzig, 1988
Salebriaria carolynae Neunzig, 1988
Salebriaria chisosensis Neunzig, 1988
Salebriaria engeli (Dyar, 1906)
Salebriaria equivoca Neunzig, 1988
Salebriaria fasciata Neunzig, 1988
Salebriaria fergusonella (A. Blanchard & Knudson, 1983)
Salebriaria floridana Neunzig, 2003
Salebriaria grandidentalis Neunzig, 1988
Salebriaria integra Neunzig, 1988
Salebriaria kanawha Neunzig, 2003
Salebriaria maximella Neunzig, 1988
Salebriaria nubiferella (Ragonot, 1887)
Salebriaria pallidella Neunzig, 2003
Salebriaria pumilella (Ragonot, 1887)
Salebriaria robustella Dyar, 1908
Salebriaria roseopunctella Neunzig, 2003
Salebriaria rufimaculatella Neunzig, 1988
Salebriaria simpliciella Neunzig, 1988
Salebriaria squamopalpiella Neunzig, 1988
Salebriaria tenebrosella (Hulst, 1887)
Salebriaria turpidella (Ragonot, 1888)

References

Phycitinae
Pyralidae genera
Taxa named by Carl Heinrich